The ethnonyms for the Poles (people) and Poland (their country) include endonyms (the way Polish people refer to themselves and their country) and exonyms (the way other peoples refer to the Poles and their country). Endonyms and most exonyms for Poles and Poland derive from the name of the West Slavic tribe of Polans (Polanie), while in some languages the exonyms for Poland to derive from the name of another tribe – the Lendians (Lędzianie).

Endonyms
The Polish words for a Pole are Polak (masculine) and Polka (feminine), Polki being the plural form for two or more women and Polacy being the plural form for the rest. The adjective "Polish" translates to Polish as polski (masculine), polska (feminine) and polskie (neuter). The common Polish name for Poland is Polska. The latter Polish word is an adjectival form which has developed into a substantive noun, most probably originating in the phrase polska ziemia, meaning "Polish land".

Rzeczpospolita

The full official name of the Polish state is Rzeczpospolita Polska which translates to "Republic of Poland". The word rzeczpospolita has been used in Poland since at least the 16th century. Originally it was a generic term used to denote any state with a republican or similar form of government. Today, however, the word is used almost solely in reference to the Polish State. Any other republic is referred to as republika in modern Polish.

Language roots

It is often assumed that all of the above names derive from the name of the Polans (Polanie), a West Slavic tribe which inhabited the territories of present-day Poland in the 9th–10th centuries. The origin of the name Polanie is theorized to be descendend ultimately from Proto-Slavic and Proto-Indo-European. It may derive from the word pole, Polish for "field".

Many ancient tribes in Europe derived their names from the nature of the land they inhabited. Gervase of Tilbury wrote in his Otia imperialia ("Recreation for an Emperor", 1211): Inter Alpes Huniae et Oceanum est Polonia, sic dicta in eorum idiomate quasi Campania.(translation: "Between the Hunnic Alps and the Ocean there is Poland, thus called "Countryside" in their idiom.") Polans may have used Polska to describe their own territory in the Warta River basin. During the 10th century, they managed to subdue and unite the Slavic tribes between the rivers Oder and Bug into a single feudal state and in the early 11th century, the name Polska was extended to the entire ethnically Polish territory. The lands originally inhabited by the Polans became known as Staropolska, or "Old Poland", and later as Wielkopolska, or "Greater Poland", while the lands conquered towards the end of the 10th century, home of the Vistulans (Wiślanie) and the Lendians, became known as Małopolska, or "Lesser Poland."

In Polish literature, Poland is sometimes referred to as Lechia, derived from Lech, the legendary founder of Poland. In the 17th–18th centuries, Sarmaci ("Sarmatians") was a popular name by which Polish nobles referred to themselves (see Sarmatism).

"Poland" in European literary sources
The earliest recorded mention of "Poland" is found in a Latin text written in 1003 and titled "Annales Hildesheimenses": "Heinricus Berthaldi comitis filius, et Bruno frater regis, et ambo Bolizavones, Polianicus vide licet ac Boemicus, a rege infideliter maiestatis rei deficient." In English: Henry, son of Berthold, and Bruno, brother of the king, and both Boleslaws, Polish and Czech, left the circle of friends of the Emperor.

Lechia

Lechia is an ancient name of Poland, stemming from the legendary founder and supposed ruler, Lech (a common first name today). The root syllable survives in several European languages and in some Central Asian and Middle Eastern names designating Poland, for example:

 Leasir in Old Norse
 Lenkija in Lithuanian
 Lehia in Romanian
 Lengyelország in Hungarian
 Lehastan in Armenian
 Lehistan in Ottoman Turkish, modern Turkish, Gagauz, Kumyk, and Crimean Tatar
 Лихѧна in Church Slavonic
 Лахьыбзэ in Kabardian
 Лаҳистон/Lahiston in Tajik
 Ləhistan/Löhüstan (لهستان) in Middle Azerbaijani
 Lahestan/Lehestan (لهستان) in Persian and Urdu
 Lähistan (لەھىستان) in Uighur
 Λεχία in Greek
 Lechitarum in Latin
 Läxstan in Tatar, Bashkir and Siberian Tatar
 Liachistan, Liachija, Lech Jer, Liach, Liach Bijligi in Karaim

Several Polish sports organizations have adopted the name Lechia. The best-known example is Lechia Gdańsk. Other examples include Lechia Lwów and Lechia Zielona Góra. In the People's Republic of Poland, the Nivea branch located in Poznań was named the Pollena-Lechia Cosmetics Factory (Fabryka Kosmetyków Pollena-Lechia).

Exonyms
Variations of the country endonym Polska became exonyms in other languages.

In Slavic languages
Exonyms for Poland in Slavic languages. The West Slavic languages such as Czech and Slovak bear particular resemblance to the Polish endonym:
Kashubian Pòlskô
Czech Polsko
Slovak Poľsko
Serbo-Croatian: Пољска / Poljska
Slovene 
Belarusian Польшча, Pol'shcha
Ukrainian Польща, Pol'shcha
Russian Польша, Pol'sha
Bulgarian Полша, Polsha
Macedonian Полска, Polska

Non-Germanic languages which borrowed their word for Poland from Slavic include: 
Abkhaz Польша, Ṗol’ša
Azerbaijani, Gagauz Polşa
Bashkir, Kazakh, Kyrgyz, Tatar, Turkmen Польша, Polşa
North Korean standard language 뽈스까 Ppolsŭkka
Uzbek Польша, Polsha

In Romance languages 
In Latin, which was the principal written language of the Middle Ages, the exonym for Poland became Polonia. It later became the basis for Poland's name in all Romance languages: 
Catalan Polònia
Occitan Polonha
French Pologne
Italian, Galician, Romanian, Spanish Polonia
Portuguese Polónia (European) / Polônia (Brazilian)

Many other languages (e.g. Albanian Polonia; Arabic بولونيا Būlūniyā; Greek Πολωνία, Polōnía; Maltese Polonja) use a variation of the Latin name.

In Germanic languages
Germans, Poland's western neighbors, called it Polen. Other Germanic languages use related exonyms:
Dutch, Danish, Swedish, Norwegian Polen
English Poland
Icelandic, Faroese Pólland
Yiddish , Poyln

Non-Germanic languages which borrowed their word for Poland from Germanic include:
Arabic , Būlandā
Esperanto Pollando, Polio / Polujo
Hebrew , Polín (Older pronunciation:  Pólin and  Polánia)
Indonesian Polandia
Irish An Pholainn
Japanese ポーランド, Pōrando
Chinese 波兰 (simplified) or 波蘭 (traditional), Bōlán
South Korean standard language 폴란드, Pollandeu
Vietnamese Ba Lan (波蘭)

Other
The Lendians, a Proto-Polish tribe who lived around the confluence of the rivers Vistula and San (south-eastern Poland), are the source of another exonym. The tribe's name likely comes from the Proto-Polish word lęda, or "scorched land". Their name was borrowed to refer to Poland mainly by peoples who lived east or south of Poland:
 лях (lyakh) is used in East Slavic languages. It also appears in Polish literature as Lachy, a synonym for "Poles" and "Poland" used by East Slavic characters. Podlasie, a Polish region on the Belarusian border, derives its name from the same root. Lachy Sądeckie is the name of a small cultural group around Nowy Sącz in southern Lesser Poland.
Lithuanian Lenkija
Hungarian Lengyelország
Georgian , Poloneti
Persian , Lahestān. The word combines Lah with a common Persian suffix -stān, which means "The land of".
Turkish Lehistan, a borrowing from Persian. It is now considered obsolete and replaced by Polonya.
Armenian , Lehastan was also borrowed from Persian.

Related words
Some common English words, as well as scientific nomenclature, derive from exonyms of Poland in various languages.
 Alla polacca, like a polonaise (in musical notation); Italian for "Polish style"
 Polacca, a type of 17th-century sailing vessel
 Polka, a dance and genre of dance music originally from Bohemia; Czech (also Polish) "Pole" (feminine)
 Polonaise, several meanings including a dance of Polish origin; from French polonaise, "Polish" (feminine)
 Pologne, several meanings including Polish Haitians, from French name for Poland
 1112 Polonia, an asteroid; from Latin Polonia, "Poland"
 Polonium, a chemical element; from Latin Polonia
 Polska, a dance of Swedish origin; from Swedish polska, "Polish"
 Poulaines, a type of shoes popular in the 15th century in Europe; from Old French polain, "Polish"
 Polonia, the term to describe people of Polish origin living outside of Poland and in other countries.

See also
 Civitas Schinesghe
 Exonym and endonym
 Lechitic languages
 Lechites
 List of country name etymologies
 Polish names
 Polish tribes
 Polonia (disambiguation)
 Polska Ludowa

References

External links

 List of exonyms for Poland article at geonames.de

History of Poland
Poland
Polish language